Lorena is a small city in McLennan County, Texas, United States. The population was 1,785 at the 2020 census. It is part of the Waco Metropolitan Statistical Area.

Geography

Lorena is located at (31.382482, –97.212998).

Lorena is off Interstate 35 and where Highway 81 originally was.

Demographics

As of the 2020 United States census, there were 1,785 people, 644 households, and 514 families residing in the city.

As of the census of 2000, 1,433 people, 537 households, and 417 families resided in the city. The population density was 444.8 people per square mile (171.8/km2). There were 551 housing units at an average density of 171.0/sq mi (66.1/km2). The racial makeup of the city was 94.21% White, 0.98% African American, 0.14% Native American, 0.91% Asian, 3.07% from other races, and 0.70% from two or more races. Hispanics or Latinos of any race were 5.86% of the population.

Of the 537 households, 39.1% had children under the age of 18 living with them, 63.5% were married couples living together, 11.9% had a female householder with no husband present, and 22.3% were not families. About 21.2% of all households were made up of individuals, and 10.1% had someone living alone who was 65 years of age or older. The average household size was 2.67 and the average family size was 3.10.

In the city, the population was distributed as 28.5% under the age of 18, 6.6% from 18 to 24, 29.9% from 25 to 44, 22.6% from 45 to 64, and 12.5% who were 65 years of age or older. The median age was 37 years. For every 100 females, there were 90.8 males. For every 100 females age 18 and over, there were 84.0 males.

The median income for a household in the city was $47,891, and for a family was $54,083. Males had a median income of $37,560 versus $27,647 for females. The per capita income for the city was $19,315. About 3.1% of families and 5.0% of the population were below the poverty line, including 4.4% of those under age 18 and 11.3% of those age 65 or over.

Education
The City of Lorena is served by the Lorena Independent School District.It is home to the Lorena Leopards.

History 

Lorena is named after one of the town's first settlers' oldest daughter, Lorena Westbrook, although its original name was "Aerl Station" after the town's founder, Daniel Aerl.

Notable people 

 Holly Tucker, singer

References

External links

 Lorena City website

Cities in McLennan County, Texas
Cities in Texas